The Nicotine and Cannabis Policy Center (NCPC) is a research institute operated by the University of California and funded by the Tobacco-Related Disease Research Program and Proposition 56 (2017). NCPC is directed by Dr. Anna Song and is housed on the campus of UC Merced, and has the goal of addressing nicotine and cannabis policy issues across the state of California and within the central San Joaquin Valley. Part of the reason for placing the institute at UC Merced was its proximity to a large diverse population as well as having a higher rate of tobacco and cannabis use compared to the rest of the state.

References 

University of California, Merced
Research institutes in California
Tobacco control
Cannabis research